The  is a three-door commuter electric multiple unit (EMU) train type operated by the private railway operator Keisei Electric Railway in the Tokyo area of Japan since 1993. The trains are not able to run on the Narita Sky Access line.

Formations
, the fleet consists of five eight-car sets, formed as shown below, with six motored cars.

Cars 2 and 7 are each fitted with two single-arm pantographs, while car 5 has one.

History
The 3400 series trains entered service in 1993, and were built using the underframes and control equipment from the original AE series Skyliner Limited Express EMUs and steel bodies based on the (stainless steel bodied) 3700 series EMUs. Set 3408 was withdrawn in 2020.

References

External links

 Keisei rolling stock information 

Keisei Electric Railway
Electric multiple units of Japan
Train-related introductions in 1993
1500 V DC multiple units of Japan
Daiei Sharyo rolling stock